Manfred Lienemann (born 24 December 1946) is a German former professional football player and manager.

References

1946 births
Living people
German footballers
Chemnitzer FC players
DDR-Oberliga players
Association football forwards
German football managers
Chemnitzer FC managers
People from Plauen
Footballers from Saxony